Dichomeris scenites is a moth in the family Gelechiidae. It was described by Edward Meyrick in 1909. It is found in South Africa.

The wingspan is about 18 mm. The forewings are pale fuscous, with scattered dark fuscous scales and a short dark fuscous costal strigula before the middle. The second discal stigma is rather dark fuscous and indistinct. The hindwings are light grey, somewhat darker towards the apex.

References

Endemic moths of South Africa
Moths described in 1909
scenites
Moths of Africa